Lorena Beaurregard de los Santos (born 8 September 1962) is a Mexican politician from the Institutional Revolutionary Party. From 2000 to 2003 she served as Deputy of the LVIII Legislature of the Mexican Congress representing Tabasco.

References

1962 births
Living people
Politicians from Tabasco
Women members of the Chamber of Deputies (Mexico)
Institutional Revolutionary Party politicians
21st-century Mexican politicians
21st-century Mexican women politicians
People from Macuspana
Deputies of the LVIII Legislature of Mexico
Members of the Chamber of Deputies (Mexico) for Tabasco